Peshtigo River State Forest is a  Wisconsin state forest in Marinette and Oconto counties. The forest is on the Peshtigo River and is next to Governor Thompson State Park. Peshtigo River State Forest was established in 2001 and is Wisconsin's newest state forest.

References

External links
Peshtigo River State Forest website

Wisconsin state forests
Protected areas of Marinette County, Wisconsin
Protected areas of Oconto County, Wisconsin
Protected areas established in 2001
2001 establishments in Wisconsin